William Edward Gregory-Leeson (born 13 October 1943) is an English filmmaker who was one of the founders of the charity War Child, which particularly focuses on help for children in war situations.

In 1993, Leeson and David Wilson produced a documentary film featuring child victims of the war in former Yugoslavia. What they saw so deeply shocked them that they established War Child, which today is a network of independent non-governmental organisations (NGOs) operating across the world to help children affected by war.

In early 1999, Leeson stepped down as CEO as a result of a accepting a bribe from the contractors of a musical therapy centre in Sarajevo. Leeson and the current War Child management and board enjoy a good relationship, with Leeson invited to advise War Child and attend its 15th anniversary celebrations for the Help CD in 2010.

Today Leeson is one of the founders and directors of GardenAfrica, a charitable organization set up in 2002 to support African families through a range of garden-related initiatives. The project seeks to transform derelict land adjacent to schools, hospitals, and clinics in African communities to help provide food security, health and nutrition, education and training, and sustainable livelihoods.

References

External links
GardenAfrica
Do-Gooders Need Not Apply — Bill Leeson, the outspoken co-founder of one of Great Britain's most high-profile charities, believes that you can do good works without being a do-gooder: "I am a deal maker. I make deals to get my story out."
Man of the Year 2000 Award — The MAN OF THE YEAR AWARD is presented to men who through their extraordinary achievements have contributed to a better world. The film makers Bill Leeson and David Wilson have, with War Child, created a platform to aid the most innocent victims of war.
Launch party for UK charity GardenAfrica — The original Pleasure Gardens at Highgate's Lauderdale House was brought to life as a launch party for UK charity GardenAfrica.

BBC report on corruption scandal
Guardian report on corruption scandal
War Child response to Guardian report on corruption scandal

1943 births
Living people
English documentary filmmakers
English humanitarians
People from Salford